The York County Savings Bank Building is a historic building in the city centre of York, in England.

The York County Savings Bank was established in 1816, and in 1829 it purchased a large timber-framed house on St Helen's Square, from R. Cattle.  Watson, Pritchett and Watson designed a new headquarters building for the bank on the site, which was completed in March 1830, at a total cost of £4,691.

In the early 20th century, the position of the doors was moved, and the internal ground floor layout was altered.  In 1924, it was extended to the north-west, along Blake Street.  In 1976, the bank became part of the Trustee Savings Bank (TSB).  The ground floor was further altered in 1991.  The TSB became part of Lloyds TSB, then independent again before leaving the building in 2015.  In 2022, the building was converted into the Impossible Motel.

The original part of the building has two storeys and is built of brick, but is faced with sandstone which was quarried near Huddersfield.  It has one-and-a-half bays facing St Helen's Square, one curving around the corner, and three-and-a-half bays facing Blake Street.  The extension has three storeys, but each is lower, allowing the roof level to remain the same, and continues a further three bays along Blake Street.

The entrance is a double door on the curved bay, flanked by Doric columns, while the first floor has Composite columns and plain pilasters.  The original doors have been converted to windows, while there is a secondary door at the far end of the extension.  Atop the corner is a pediment, carved with the words "SAVINGS BANK".

Inside, the former boardroom on the first floor has a coffered ceiling, with oak leaf and acorn decorations.  In the extension is a early 19th-century chimney piece, which has been relocated.

The building was grade II listed in 1968.

References

Buildings and structures completed in 1830
Grade II listed buildings in York
St Helen's Square